Polypoetes nox is a moth of the family Notodontidae first described by Herbert Druce in 1909. It is found in Colombia and Venezuela.

References

Moths described in 1909
Notodontidae of South America